Chen Shunyao (September 1917 – 31 July 2019) was a Chinese politician and academic administrator. She served as deputy party secretary of Tsinghua University, and was a delegate to the First and Third National People's Congresses. She was the wife of the high-ranking Chinese Communist Party (CCP) leader Song Ping, a former member of the CCP Politburo Standing Committee.

Republic of China 
Chen was born in September 1917 in Jinan, Shandong, Republic of China, with her ancestral home in Fuzhou, Fujian. In September 1936, she entered the Department of Civil Engineering of Tsinghua University, where she met her future husband Song Ping, a chemistry student and activist in the December 9th Movement against Japanese aggression in China.

When the Second Sino-Japanese War broke out in 1937 and the Japanese army occupied Beijing, Chen and Song evacuated with Tsinghua University to Changsha in southern China, where she joined the Chinese Communist Party (CCP) in December 1937. She later went with Song to the Communist headquarters in Yan'an. She studied at the CCP Central Party School and worked as Zhou Enlai's secretary in 1939.

In 1940, Chen was sent by the Communist Party as a representative in the Kuomintang government in China's wartime capital Chongqing, and later Nanjing after the end of World War II. When the Chinese Civil War broke out, she was transferred to the Communist-held area in Northeast China, where she worked in education, including a stint as the principal of Harbin Girls' High School.

People's Republic of China 
After the founding of the People's Republic of China, she returned to Tsinghua University in 1953. She worked for the next eight years at the university, successively as deputy dean, assistant president, and deputy party secretary. Future CCP general secretary and paramount leader Hu Jintao, then a Tsinghua student, was a protégé of hers and later promoted by her husband Song Ping.

In 1961, she was transferred to Northwest China and served as vice minister of propaganda of Gansu Province. She returned to Beijing in 1981, and worked in the Research Office of the Secretariat of the Communist Party of China until her retirement in 1988.

Chen was a delegate to the 1st National People's Congress in 1954 and participated in drafting the first Constitution of the People's Republic of China. She was also a delegate to the 3rd National People's Congress and the 7th Chinese People's Political Consultative Conference (CPPCC).

Personal life
Chen's younger brother, Chen Junwu, is a petroleum chemist and an academician of the Chinese Academy of Sciences.

Chen died on 31 July 2019 in Beijing, at the age of 101 from lung cancer. Her funeral was held on August 3, 2019. She was buried at Babaoshan Revolutionary Cemetery in Beijing near her parents, 2 brothers and 4 sisters.

References 

1917 births
2019 deaths
People's Republic of China politicians from Shandong
Politicians from Jinan
Tsinghua University alumni
Academic staff of Tsinghua University
Delegates to the 1st National People's Congress
Delegates to the 3rd National People's Congress
Political office-holders in Gansu
20th-century Chinese women politicians
Chinese centenarians
Women centenarians
Burials at Babaoshan Revolutionary Cemetery